Nogueira da Regedoura is a Portuguese parish, located in the municipality of Santa Maria da Feira. The population in 2011 was 5,790, with an area of 5.10 km2.

It is supposed (in the Medieval documents), the older name of the parish was known as "Nogeira de Liuaes". The second part of that name is related to the present locality of Olivães.

References

Freguesias of Santa Maria da Feira